Bangalaia ochreomarmorata is a species of beetle in the family Cerambycidae. It was described by Stephan von Breuning in 1958. It is known from the Democratic Republic of the Congo.

References

Prosopocerini
Beetles described in 1958
Endemic fauna of the Democratic Republic of the Congo